Hovin may refer to:

Places

Iran
Hovin, Iran, a village in Chahardangeh Rural District, Hurand District, Ahar County, East Azerbaijan Province

Norway
Hovin or Valle-Hovin, a neighborhood in the city of Oslo
Hovin, Telemark, a former municipality in Telemark county
Hovin, Tinn, a village in Tinn municipality in Telemark county
Hovin, Trøndelag, a village in Melhus municipality in Trøndelag county
Hovin, Østfold, a village in Indre Østfold municipality in Østfold county, split from the former municipality of Spydeberg
Hovin Church (Telemark), a church in Tinn municipality in Telemark county